Rukanpur Railway Station (Urdu and ) is located in Rukanpur Village, Lodhran District of the province of Punjab in Pakistan.

See also
 List of railway stations in Pakistan
 Pakistan Railways

External links

Railway stations in Lodhran District
Railway stations on Lodhran–Khanewal Branch Line